Isidro de Alaix Fábregas, Count of Vergara and Viscount of Villarrobledo, (1790 in Ceuta – October 15, 1853 in Madrid) was a Spanish general of the First Carlist War, supporting the cause of the Liberals, who backed Isabella II of Spain and her regent mother Maria Christina.  Born at Ceuta, Alaix fought during the Spanish War of Independence and also participated in the campaigns in South America against the independence movements there.

He inflicted a serious defeat on the Carlist general Miguel Gómez Damas at the Battle of Villarrobledo, which led to his promotion to the rank of general and the earning of the title of Viscount of Villarrobledo, as well as the Cross of Saint Ferdinand.  He later served as a senator-for-life, Minister of War, and served as interim president of the Council of Ministers from December 9, 1838 to February 3, 1839 –in effect, serving as head of the Spanish government.

As Minister of War, he signed the Vergara Embrace, which ended the First Carlist War, and thereby earned the title of Count of Vergara.

He died at Madrid.

External links
Spain: Heads of Government: 1834-1868
 Ficha histórica como senador
 Notas biográficas

1790 births
1853 deaths
People from Ceuta
Counts of Spain
Viscounts of Spain
Spanish generals
Military personnel of the First Carlist War
Prime Ministers of Spain
Government ministers of Spain
Members of the Senate of Spain
Moderate Party (Spain) politicians
19th-century Spanish politicians
Laureate Cross of Saint Ferdinand
Spanish military personnel of the Napoleonic Wars